Jenő Major (6 August 1891 – 13 January 1972) was a Hungarian military officer, who served as the last Commander of the Hungarian Second Army during the Second World War.

After the destruction of his Army, he became Inspector-General of the Hungarian Army in Germany.
He avoided extradition to Hungary and lived the remainder of his life in West Germany.

Works
Emléktöredékek - Visszaemlékezés az 1944. március és 1945. július közötti háborús eseményekre, Petit Real, Budapest, 2000.

References
 Magyar Életrajzi Lexikon
[www.generals.dk/general/Major/Jëno/Hungary.html Generals.dk]

1891 births
1972 deaths
People from Baranya County
Hungarian generals
Hungarian soldiers
Hungarian military personnel of World War II